McGiffin is a surname. Notable people with the surname include:

Carol McGiffin (born 1960), English television and radio presenter
Peter McGiffin, Australian cricket coach
Philo McGiffin (1860–1897), United States Navy officer
Roy McGiffin (1890–1918), Canadian ice hockey player

See also
McGaffin
McGuffin